Kharrazi Expressway is an expressway in Esfahan, Iran.

Streets in Isfahan